Veronica Olivier (born 1 February 1990) is an Italian actress and television personality.

Career
Olivier first became well known for her starring role in the 2009 Italian film Amore 14. In 2010 she participated in the sixth season of Ballando con le stelle, the Italian version of Dancing with the Stars. Paired with Raimondo Todaro, Olivier won the competition.

Filmography

Cinema

Television

References

External links

Official website

1990 births
Living people
People from Velletri
Italian film actresses
Italian television actresses
Reality show winners